Jo Ann Sevin (born April 5, 1977) is an American sports shooter. She competed in the women's 10 metre air pistol event at the 1996 Summer Olympics.

References

External links
 

1977 births
Living people
American female sport shooters
Olympic shooters of the United States
Shooters at the 1996 Summer Olympics
Place of birth missing (living people)
20th-century American women